This is a list of the mammal species recorded in Gabon. Of the mammal species in Gabon, four are endangered, nine are vulnerable, and seven are near threatened.

The following tags are used to highlight each species' conservation status as assessed by the International Union for Conservation of Nature:

Some species were assessed using an earlier set of criteria. Species assessed using this system have the following instead of near threatened and least concern categories:

Order: Afrosoricida (tenrecs and golden moles) 
The order Afrosoricida contains the golden moles of southern Africa and the tenrecs of Madagascar and Africa, two families of small mammals that were traditionally part of the order Insectivora.

Family: Tenrecidae (tenrecs)
Subfamily: Potamogalinae
Genus: Potamogale
 Giant otter shrew, Potamogale velox LC

Order: Hyracoidea (hyraxes) 
The hyraxes are any of four species of fairly small, thickset, herbivorous mammals in the order Hyracoidea. About the size of a domestic cat they are well-furred, with rounded bodies and a stumpy tail. They are native to Africa and the Middle East.

Family: Procaviidae (hyraxes)
Genus: Dendrohyrax
 Western tree hyrax, D. dorsalis

Order: Proboscidea (elephants) 

The elephants comprise three living species and are the largest living land animals.

Family: Elephantidae (elephants)
Genus: Loxodonta
African forest elephant, L. cyclotis

Order: Sirenia (manatees and dugongs) 
Sirenia is an order of fully aquatic, herbivorous mammals that inhabit rivers, estuaries, coastal marine waters, swamps, and marine wetlands. All four species are endangered.

Family: Trichechidae
Genus: Trichechus
 African manatee, Trichechus senegalensis VU

Order: Primates 

The order Primates contains humans and their closest relatives: lemurs, lorisoids, tarsiers, monkeys, and apes.

Suborder: Strepsirrhini
Infraorder: Lemuriformes
Superfamily: Lorisoidea
Family: Lorisidae
Genus: Arctocebus
 Golden angwantibo, Arctocebus aureus LR/nt
Genus: Perodicticus
 Potto, Perodicticus potto LR/lc
Family: Galagidae
Genus: Sciurocheirus
 Bioko Allen's bushbaby, Sciurocheirus alleni LR/nt
Genus: Galagoides
 Prince Demidoff's bushbaby, Galagoides demidovii LR/lc
 Thomas's bushbaby, Galagoides thomasi LR/lc
Genus: Euoticus
 Southern needle-clawed bushbaby, Euoticus elegantulus LR/nt
Suborder: Haplorhini
Infraorder: Simiiformes
Parvorder: Catarrhini
Superfamily: Cercopithecoidea
Family: Cercopithecidae (Old World monkeys)
Genus: Miopithecus
 Gabon talapoin, Miopithecus ogouensis LR/lc
Genus: Cercopithecus
 Moustached guenon, Cercopithecus cephus LR/lc
 De Brazza's monkey, Cercopithecus neglectus LR/lc
 Greater spot-nosed monkey, Cercopithecus nictitans LR/lc
 Crowned guenon, Cercopithecus pogonias LR/lc
 Sun-tailed monkey, Cercopithecus solatus VU
Genus: Lophocebus
 Grey-cheeked mangabey, Lophocebus albigena LR/lc
Genus: Cercocebus
 Collared mangabey, Cercocebus torquatus LR/nt
Genus: Mandrillus
 Drill, Mandrillus leucophaeus EN
 Mandrill, Mandrillus sphinx VU
Subfamily: Colobinae
Genus: Colobus
 Mantled guereza, Colobus guereza LR/lc
 Black colobus, Colobus satanas VU
Superfamily: Hominoidea
Family: Hominidae (great apes)
Subfamily: Homininae
Tribe: Gorillini
Genus: Gorilla
 Western lowland gorilla, Gorilla gorilla EN 
Tribe: Panini
Genus: Pan
 Common chimpanzee, Pan troglodytes EN

Order: Rodentia (rodents) 
Rodents make up the largest order of mammals, with over 40% of mammalian species. They have two incisors in the upper and lower jaw which grow continually and must be kept short by gnawing.

Suborder: Hystricognathi
Family: Hystricidae (Old World porcupines)
Genus: Atherurus
 African brush-tailed porcupine, Atherurus africanus LC
Family: Thryonomyidae (cane rats)
Genus: Thryonomys
 Greater cane rat, Thryonomys swinderianus LC
Suborder: Sciurognathi
Family: Anomaluridae
Subfamily: Anomalurinae
Genus: Anomalurus
 Lord Derby's scaly-tailed squirrel, Anomalurus derbianus LC
 Dwarf scaly-tailed squirrel, Anomalurus pusillus LC
Genus: Anomalurops
 Beecroft's scaly-tailed squirrel, Anomalurops beecrofti LC
Subfamily: Zenkerellinae
Genus: Idiurus
 Long-eared flying mouse, Idiurus macrotis LC
Genus: Zenkerella
 Flightless scaly-tailed squirrel, Zenkerella insignis DD
Family: Sciuridae (squirrels)
Subfamily: Xerinae
Tribe: Protoxerini
Genus: Epixerus
 Baifran palm squirrel, Epixerus wilsoni DD
Genus: Funisciurus
 Lady Burton's rope squirrel, Funisciurus isabella LC
 Fire-footed rope squirrel, Funisciurus pyrropus LC
Genus: Myosciurus
 African pygmy squirrel, Myosciurus pumilio DD
Genus: Paraxerus
 Green bush squirrel, Paraxerus poensis LC
Genus: Protoxerus
 Forest giant squirrel, Protoxerus stangeri LC
Family: Gliridae (dormice)
Subfamily: Graphiurinae
Genus: Graphiurus
 Nagtglas's African dormouse, Graphiurus nagtglasii LC
 Silent dormouse, Graphiurus surdus DD
Family: Nesomyidae
Subfamily: Cricetomyinae
Genus: Cricetomys
 Emin's pouched rat, Cricetomys emini LC
 Gambian pouched rat, Cricetomys gambianus LC
Family: Muridae (mice, rats, voles, gerbils, hamsters, etc.)
Subfamily: Deomyinae
Genus: Deomys
 Link rat, Deomys ferrugineus LC
Genus: Lophuromys
 Fire-bellied brush-furred rat, Lophuromys nudicaudus LC
 Rusty-bellied brush-furred rat, Lophuromys sikapusi LC
Subfamily: Murinae
Genus: Colomys
 African wading rat, Colomys goslingi LC
Genus: Grammomys
 Shining thicket rat, Grammomys rutilans LC
Genus: Heimyscus
 African smoky mouse, Heimyscus fumosus LC
Genus: Hybomys
 Peters's striped mouse, Hybomys univittatus LC
Genus: Hylomyscus
 Beaded wood mouse, Hylomyscus aeta LC
 Allen's wood mouse, Hylomyscus alleni LC
 Little wood mouse, Hylomyscus parvus LC
 Stella wood mouse, Hylomyscus stella LC
Genus: Malacomys
 Big-eared swamp rat, Malacomys longipes LC
Genus: Mastomys
 Natal multimammate mouse, Mastomys natalensis LC
Genus: Mus
 African pygmy mouse, Mus minutoides LC
 Peters's mouse, Mus setulosus LC
 Thomas's pygmy mouse, Mus sorella LC
Genus: Oenomys
 Common rufous-nosed rat, Oenomys hypoxanthus LC
Genus: Praomys
 Jackson's soft-furred mouse, Praomys jacksoni LC
 Tullberg's soft-furred mouse, Praomys tullbergi LC
Genus: Stochomys
 Target rat, Stochomys longicaudatus LC

Order: Soricomorpha (shrews, moles, and solenodons) 
The "shrew-forms" are insectivorous mammals. The shrews and solenodons closely resemble mice while the moles are stout-bodied burrowers.

Family: Soricidae (shrews)
Subfamily: Crocidurinae
Genus: Crocidura
 Bates's shrew, Crocidura batesi LC
 Long-footed shrew, Crocidura crenata LC
 Dent's shrew, Crocidura denti LC
 Long-tailed musk shrew, Crocidura dolichura LC
 Goliath shrew, Crocidura goliath LC
 Grasse's shrew, Crocidura grassei LC
 Dark shrew, Crocidura maurisca DD
 African giant shrew, Crocidura olivieri LC
 Turbo shrew, Crocidura turba LC
Genus: Paracrocidura
 Lesser large-headed shrew, Paracrocidura schoutedeni LC
Genus: Suncus
 Remy's pygmy shrew, Suncus remyi LC
Genus: Sylvisorex
 Johnston's forest shrew, Sylvisorex johnstoni LC
 Greater forest shrew, Sylvisorex ollula LC
Subfamily: Myosoricinae
Genus: Congosorex
 Lesser Congo shrew, Congosorex verheyeni LC

Order: Chiroptera (bats) 
The bats' most distinguishing feature is that their forelimbs are developed as wings, making them the only mammals capable of flight. Bat species account for about 20% of all mammals.

Family: Pteropodidae (flying foxes, Old World fruit bats)
Subfamily: Pteropodinae
Genus: Eidolon
 Straw-coloured fruit bat, Eidolon helvum LC
Genus: Epomophorus
 Wahlberg's epauletted fruit bat, Epomophorus wahlbergi LC
Genus: Epomops
 Franquet's epauletted fruit bat, Epomops franqueti LC
Genus: Hypsignathus
 Hammer-headed bat, Hypsignathus monstrosus LC
Genus: Micropteropus
 Peters's dwarf epauletted fruit bat, Micropteropus pusillus LC
Genus: Myonycteris
 Little collared fruit bat, Myonycteris torquata LC
Genus: Rousettus
 Egyptian fruit bat, Rousettus aegyptiacus LC
Genus: Scotonycteris
 Zenker's fruit bat, Scotonycteris zenkeri NT
Subfamily: Macroglossinae
Genus: Megaloglossus
 Woermann's bat, Megaloglossus woermanni LC
Family: Vespertilionidae
Subfamily: Kerivoulinae
Genus: Kerivoula
 Lesser woolly bat, Kerivoula lanosa LC
Subfamily: Myotinae
Genus: Myotis
 Rufous mouse-eared bat, Myotis bocagii LC
Subfamily: Vespertilioninae
Genus: Glauconycteris
 Beatrix's bat, Glauconycteris beatrix NT
 Butterfly bat, Glauconycteris variegata LC
Genus: Hypsugo
 Mouselike pipistrelle, Hypsugo musciculus DD
Genus: Mimetillus
 Moloney's mimic bat, Mimetillus moloneyi LC
Genus: Neoromicia
 Dark-brown serotine, Neoromicia brunneus NT
 Cape serotine, Neoromicia capensis LC
 Banana pipistrelle, Neoromicia nanus LC
 White-winged serotine, Neoromicia tenuipinnis LC
Genus: Pipistrellus
 Tiny pipistrelle, Pipistrellus nanulus LC
 Rüppell's pipistrelle, Pipistrellus rueppelli LC
Subfamily: Miniopterinae
Genus: Miniopterus
 Greater long-fingered bat, Miniopterus inflatus LC
Family: Molossidae
Genus: Chaerephon
 Duke of Abruzzi's free-tailed bat, Chaerephon aloysiisabaudiae NT
Genus: Mops
 Sierra Leone free-tailed bat, Mops brachypterus LC
 Railer bat, Mops thersites LC
Genus: Myopterus
 Bini free-tailed bat, Myopterus whitleyi LC
Family: Emballonuridae
Genus: Saccolaimus
 Pel's pouched bat, Saccolaimus peli NT
Genus: Taphozous
 Mauritian tomb bat, Taphozous mauritianus LC
Family: Nycteridae
Genus: Nycteris
 Bate's slit-faced bat, Nycteris arge LC
 Large slit-faced bat, Nycteris grandis LC
 Hairy slit-faced bat, Nycteris hispida LC
 Intermediate slit-faced bat, Nycteris intermedia NT
 Large-eared slit-faced bat, Nycteris macrotis LC
Family: Megadermatidae
Genus: Lavia
 Yellow-winged bat, Lavia frons LC
Family: Rhinolophidae
Subfamily: Rhinolophinae
Genus: Rhinolophus
 Halcyon horseshoe bat, Rhinolophus alcyone LC
 Rüppell's horseshoe bat, Rhinolophus fumigatus LC
 Lander's horseshoe bat, Rhinolophus landeri LC
 Forest horseshoe bat, Rhinolophus silvestris VU
Subfamily: Hipposiderinae
Genus: Hipposideros
 Benito roundleaf bat, Hipposideros beatus LC
 Sundevall's roundleaf bat, Hipposideros caffer LC
 Cyclops roundleaf bat, Hipposideros cyclops LC
 Sooty roundleaf bat, Hipposideros fuliginosus NT
 Giant roundleaf bat, Hipposideros gigas LC
 Noack's roundleaf bat, Hipposideros ruber LC

Order: Pholidota (pangolins) 
The order Pholidota comprises the eight species of pangolin. Pangolins are anteaters and have the powerful claws, elongated snout and long tongue seen in the other unrelated anteater species.

Family: Manidae
Genus: Manis
 Giant pangolin, Manis gigantea LR/lc
 Long-tailed pangolin, Manis tetradactyla LR/lc
 Tree pangolin, Manis tricuspis LR/lc

Order: Cetacea (whales) 

The order Cetacea includes whales, dolphins and porpoises. They are the mammals most fully adapted to aquatic life with a spindle-shaped nearly hairless body, protected by a thick layer of blubber, and forelimbs and tail modified to provide propulsion underwater.

Suborder: Mysticeti
Family: Balaenopteridae
Subfamily: Balaenopterinae
Genus: Balaenoptera
 Common minke whale, Balaenoptera acutorostrata LC
 Antarctic minke whale, Balaenoptera bonaerensis DD
 Sei whale, Balaenoptera borealis EN
 Bryde's whale, Balaenoptera edeni DD
 Blue whale, Balaenoptera musculus EN
 Fin whale, Balaenoptera physalus EN
Subfamily: Megapterinae
Genus: Megaptera
 Humpback whale, Megaptera novaeangliae VU
Family: Balaenidae
Genus: Eubalaena
 Southern right whale, Eubalaena australis LR/cd 
Suborder: Odontoceti
Superfamily: Platanistoidea
Family: Physeteridae
Genus: Physeter
 Sperm whale, Physeter macrocephalus VU
Family: Kogiidae
Genus: Kogia
 Pygmy sperm whale, Kogia breviceps LR/lc
 Dwarf sperm whale, Kogia sima LR/lc
Family: Ziphidae
Subfamily: Hyperoodontinae
Genus: Mesoplodon
 Blainville's beaked whale, Mesoplodon densirostris DD
 Gervais' beaked whale, Mesoplodon europaeus DD
Genus: Ziphius
 Cuvier's beaked whale, Ziphius cavirostris DD
Family: Delphinidae (marine dolphins)
Genus: Steno
 Rough-toothed dolphin, Steno bredanensis DD
Genus: Tursiops
 Common bottlenose dolphin, Tursiops truncatus LC
Genus: Delphinus
 Long-beaked common dolphin, Delphinus capensis DD
Genus: Stenella
 Pantropical spotted dolphin, Stenella attenuata LR/cd
 Striped dolphin, Stenella coeruleoalba LR/cd
 Atlantic spotted dolphin, Stenella frontalis DD
 Clymene dolphin, Stenella clymene DD
 Spinner dolphin, Stenella longirostris LR/cd
Genus: Lagenodelphis
 Fraser's dolphin, Lagenodelphis hosei DD
Genus: Sousa
 Atlantic humpback dolphin, Sousa teuszii
Genus: Orcinus
 Orca, Orcinus orca LR/cd
Genus: Feresa
 Pygmy killer whale, Feresa attenuata DD
Genus: Pseudorca
 False killer whale, Pseudorca crassidens LR/lc
Genus: Globicephala
 Short-finned pilot whale, Globicephala macrorhynchus LR/cd
Genus: Peponocephala
 Melon-headed whale, Peponocephala electra DD

Order: Carnivora (carnivorans) 

There are over 260 species of carnivorans, the majority of which feed primarily on meat. They have a characteristic skull shape and dentition.
Suborder: Feliformia
Family: Felidae (cats)
Subfamily: Felinae
Genus: Caracal
Caracal, C. caracal LC
African golden cat, C. aurata 
Genus: Leptailurus
 Serval, Leptailurus serval LC
Subfamily: Pantherinae
Genus: Panthera
 Lion, Panthera leo VU
 Leopard, Panthera pardus VU
Family: Viverridae
Subfamily: Viverrinae
Genus: Civettictis
 African civet, Civettictis civetta LC
Genus: Genetta
 Rusty-spotted genet, Genetta maculata LC
 Servaline genet, Genetta servalina LC
 Hausa genet, Genetta thierryi LC
Genus: Poiana
 Central African oyan, Poiana richardsonii LC
Family: Nandiniidae
Genus: Nandinia
 African palm civet, Nandinia binotata LC
Family: Herpestidae (mongooses)
Genus: Atilax
 Marsh mongoose, Atilax paludinosus LC
Genus: Bdeogale
 Black-footed mongoose, Bdeogale nigripes LC
Genus: Xenogale
 Long-nosed mongoose, Xenogale naso LC
Family: Hyaenidae (hyaenas)
Genus: Crocuta
 Spotted hyena, Crocuta crocuta LC
Suborder: Caniformia
Family: Canidae (dogs, foxes)
Genus: Lupulella
 Side-striped jackal, L. adusta 
Genus: Lycaon
 African wild dog, L. pictus  extirpated
Family: Mustelidae (mustelids)
Genus: Ictonyx
 Striped polecat, Ictonyx striatus LC
Genus: Mellivora
 Honey badger, Mellivora capensis LC
Genus: Hydrictis
 Speckle-throated otter, H. maculicollis LC
Genus: Aonyx
 African clawless otter, Aonyx capensis LC

Order: Artiodactyla (even-toed ungulates) 

The even-toed ungulates are ungulates whose weight is borne about equally by the third and fourth toes, rather than mostly or entirely by the third as in perissodactyls. There are about 220 artiodactyl species, including many that are of great economic importance to humans.

Family: Suidae (pigs)
Subfamily: Phacochoerinae
Genus: Phacochoerus
 Common warthog, Phacochoerus africanus LR/lc
Subfamily: Suinae
Genus: Hylochoerus
 Giant forest hog, Hylochoerus meinertzhageni LR/lc
Genus: Potamochoerus
 Red river hog, Potamochoerus porcus LR/lc
Family: Hippopotamidae (hippopotamuses)
Genus: Hippopotamus
 Hippopotamus, Hippopotamus amphibius VU
Family: Tragulidae
Genus: Hyemoschus
 Water chevrotain, Hyemoschus aquaticus DD
Family: Bovidae (cattle, antelope, sheep, goats)
Subfamily: Antilopinae
Genus: Neotragus
 Bates's pygmy antelope, Neotragus batesi LR/nt
Subfamily: Bovinae
Genus: Syncerus
 African forest buffalo, Syncerus caffer LR/cd 
Genus: Tragelaphus
 Bongo, Tragelaphus eurycerus LR/nt
 Bushbuck, Tragelaphus scriptus LR/lc
 Sitatunga, Tragelaphus spekii LR/nt
Subfamily: Cephalophinae
Genus: Cephalophus
 Peters's duiker, Cephalophus callipygus LR/nt
 Bay duiker, Cephalophus dorsalis LR/nt
 White-bellied duiker, Cephalophus leucogaster LR/nt
 Blue duiker, Cephalophus monticola LR/lc
 Black-fronted duiker, Cephalophus nigrifrons LR/nt
 Ogilby's duiker, Cephalophus ogilbyi LR/nt
 Yellow-backed duiker, Cephalophus silvicultor LR/nt
Genus: Sylvicapra
 Common duiker, Sylvicapra grimmia LR/lc
Subfamily: Aepycerotinae
Genus: Aepyceros
Impala, A. melampus LC introduced
Subfamily: Reduncinae
Genus: Kobus
 Waterbuck, Kobus ellipsiprymnus LR/cd
Genus: Redunca
 Southern reedbuck, Redunca arundinum LR/cd

See also
List of chordate orders
Lists of mammals by region
List of prehistoric mammals
Mammal classification
List of mammals described in the 2000s

Notes

References
 

Gabon
Gabon
mammals
'